The Foundations of Psychoanalysis: A Philosophical Critique is a 1984 book by the philosopher Adolf Grünbaum, in which the author offers a philosophical critique of the work of Sigmund Freud, the founder of psychoanalysis. The book was first published in the United States by the University of California Press. Grünbaum evaluates the status of psychoanalysis as a natural science, criticizes the method of free association and Freud's theory of dreams, and discusses the psychoanalytic theory of paranoia. He argues that Freud, in his efforts to defend psychoanalysis as a method of clinical investigation, employed an argument that Grünbaum refers to as the "Tally Argument"; according to Grünbaum, it rests on the premises that only psychoanalysis can provide patients with correct insight into the unconscious pathogens of their psychoneuroses and that such insight is necessary for successful treatment of neurotic patients. Grünbaum argues that the argument suffers from major problems. Grünbaum also criticizes the views of psychoanalysis put forward by other philosophers, including the hermeneutic interpretations propounded by Jürgen Habermas and Paul Ricœur, as well as Karl Popper's position that psychoanalytic propositions cannot be disconfirmed and that psychoanalysis is therefore a pseudoscience.

The book received positive reviews and became influential. It was seen as a turning point in the debate over psychoanalysis and was regarded by some critics of Freud as a masterpiece. Grünbaum was credited with providing the most important philosophical critique of Freud, refuting the views of Habermas, Ricœur, and Popper, convincingly criticizing free association and Freud's theory of dreams, and demonstrating that the validation of Freud's hypotheses must come mainly from extra-clinical studies. Some reviewers suggested that his arguments helped to show that the psychoanalytic approach to homosexuality is flawed. However, critics described the book as poorly written, and faulted Grünbaum's discussion of the "Tally Argument", questioning whether it was ever actually employed by Freud; they also rejected or disputed Grünbaum's conclusions about the method of free association and the psychoanalytic theory of paranoia. Some commentators believed that Grünbaum devoted too much space to criticizing hermeneutic interpretations of Freud and others saw a hermeneutic understanding of psychoanalysis as having more merit than he was willing to allow. Psychoanalysts have given Grünbaum greater attention than other critics of psychoanalysis, but have criticized him for his treatment of psychoanalytic theory.

Summary

Grünbaum offers a "philosophical critique of the foundations of Sigmund Freud's psychoanalysis" and reevaluates Freud's view that psychoanalysis is a natural science. He criticizes the hermeneutic interpretation of psychoanalysis propounded by the philosophers Jürgen Habermas, in Knowledge and Human Interests (1968), and Paul Ricœur, in Freud and Philosophy (1965) and Hermeneutics and the Human Sciences (1981). He maintains that they base their arguments on a mistaken interpretation of Freud's writings, as well as on misunderstandings of the methods of natural sciences. According to Grünbaum, Freud made his claim that psychoanalysis is a natural science primarily on behalf of his clinical theory, which was concerned with personality, psychopathology, and therapy, and which Freud considered its most essential part, rather than for its metapsychology, which was admittedly speculative, and which in Freud's view could be abandoned if necessary. He maintains that Freud has been misunderstood by Habermas and Ricœur as having based his claim that the clinical theory is a natural science on reduction of its hypotheses to those of the metapsychology.

Grünbaum argues that Habermas's conclusions about the therapeutic effects of psychoanalytic treatment are incoherent, and incompatible with Freud's hypotheses. He maintains that Habermas, based on his own limited understanding of science, puts forward a mistaken contrast between the human sciences and sciences such as physics. He rejects Habermas's view that it is the acceptance of psychoanalytic interpretations by patients in analytic treatment that establishes their validity, and accuses him of quoting Freud out of context to help him make his case.

He argues that Ricœur incorrectly limits the relevance of psychoanalytic theory to verbal statements made during analytic therapy. He accuses Ricœur of being motivated by the desire to protect his hermeneutic understanding of psychoanalysis from scientific examination and criticism, and maintains that his arguments rest on an untenable dichotomy between theory and observation and that he takes a reductive form of behaviorism as his model of scientific psychology. He also argues that Ricœur's view that psychoanalysis provides a "semantics of desire" mistakenly equates symptoms with linguistic representations of their causes, and accuses Ricœur of endorsing the psychoanalyst Jacques Lacan's view that a symptom resembles "a language whose speech must be realized". He maintains that such a view is mistaken, arguing that if it were appropriate for neurotic symptoms, it would also be applicable to both psychosomatic and somatic symptoms. However, he gives Ricœur some credit for later reassessing his views. He criticizes the philosopher Karl Popper's view that psychoanalytic claims in general cannot be falsified. Grünbaum argues that the psychoanalytic theory of paranoia is in principle falsifiable, since Freud's view that repressed homosexuality is a necessary cause of paranoia entails the testable claim that a decline in social sanctions against homosexuality should result in a decline in paranoia. Grünbaum also discusses the work of the philosopher Clark Glymour.

Grünbaum argues that Freud, in a 1917 lecture on "Analytic Therapy", advanced a defense of psychoanalysis as a method of clinical investigation that went unnoticed in scholarly literature until Grünbaum drew attention to it in papers published in 1979 and 1980. Grünbaum refers to this defense as the "Tally Argument", and maintains that Freud used it to justify the claim that durable therapeutic success guarantees that the interpretations made in the course of therapy are accurate. He summarizes its two premises as being that "only the psychoanalytic method of interpretation and treatment can yield or mediate to the patient correct insight into the unconscious pathogens of his psychoneurosis" and that the correct insight of a patient into "the etiology of his affliction and into the unconscious dynamics of his character" is "causally necessary for the therapeutic conquest of his neurosis." According to Grünbaum, these premises together entail that there is no spontaneous remission of psychoneuroses, and that, if their cure is ever accomplished, psychoanalysis is "uniquely therapeutic for such disorders" as compared to rival therapies. Grünbaum criticizes the "Tally Argument", arguing that it suffers from major problems. Referring to the work of the psychiatrists Allan Hobson and Robert McCarley, he criticizes the theory of dreams Freud propounded in The Interpretation of Dreams (1899). He also criticizes the method of free association, the theory of Freudian slips Freud propounded in The Psychopathology of Everyday Life (1901), and Freud's metapsychology, and discusses the transference.

Background and publication history
According to Grünbaum, his initial motivation for his critical examination of psychoanalysis came from his questioning of Karl Popper's philosophy of science: he suspected that Popper's argument that psychoanalysis is unfalsifiable misrepresents its faults. The critic Frederick Crews read the draft of The Foundations of Psychoanalysis in 1977 and helped Grünbaum to obtain a publication offer from the University of California Press. The book was first published in 1984 by the University of California Press. A paperback edition of The Foundations of Psychoanalysis followed in 1985. The book was published in German translation by Philipp Reclam in 1988, and in French translation by Presses Universitaires de France in 1996.

Reception

Overview
The Foundations of Psychoanalysis was influential. Seen as a turning point in debates over psychoanalysis, the book is considered the most important philosophical critique of Freud. Those influenced by the book include psychoanalysts, who have given Grünbaum greater attention than other critics of psychoanalysis from outside their discipline. The book became regarded as a masterpiece by some critics of Freud. Authors who have endorsed Grünbaum's critique of psychoanalysis, in whole or in part, include the psychologist Theodore Millon, the historian Edward Shorter, and the psychologist Morris N. Eagle. In Eagle's view, developments in psychoanalysis subsequent to Freud do not provide an answer to Grünbaum's critique of the discipline. The historians Paul Robinson and Peter Gay have both credited Grünbaum with convincingly criticizing Popper, although Robinson believed that Grünbaum too readily dismissed Popper's charge that Freud's theories cannot be falsified.

Grünbaum's criticism of hermeneutic interpretations of psychoanalysis has received praise, although Grünbaum has also been criticized for devoting an excessive amount of space to criticizing such interpretations. The psychiatrist Stephen H. Richmond, who credited Grünbaum with carefully criticizing Freud, considered Grünbaum correct to stress that a valid science must employ well-designed experimental studies rather than depending on case studies. According to Richmond, the neuroscientist Eric Kandel maintained in 2005 that Grünbaum's critique of psychoanalysis had "stood essentially unchallenged to the present day."

Authors supportive of psychoanalysis have criticized The Foundations of Psychoanalysis. The psychologist Margaret Chernack Beaudoin, the philosopher Gregory A. Trotter, and the scholar of rhetoric Alan G. Gross, have criticized its treatment of Ricœur. Beaudoin maintained that Grünbaum was mistaken to attribute to Ricœur the view that language is primary for psychoanalysis and that symptoms should be assimilated to linguistic expressions. She also argued that Grünbaum mistakenly claimed that Ricoeur endorsed Lacan's views and quoted Freud out of context to support "a purely causal interpretation of Freudian theory". Trotter maintained that Grünbaum mistakenly denied that "psychical reality is sufficiently different from material reality as to warrant different epistemic standards", and accused him of misunderstanding Ricœur. The psychiatrist Edwin R. Wallace IV criticized the work for its discussion of suggestion and understanding of analytic practice, as well as its reliance on a "positivistic vision of science." The philosopher Jonathan Lear argued that Grünbaum's arguments about the scientific status of psychoanalysis, like most criticisms and defenses of psychoanalysis, are irrelevant. He considered Grünbaum's account of Freud tendentious. The psychoanalyst W. W. Meissner argued that Grünbaum "forces psychoanalytic propositions into artificial positions that do not reflect the actuality of analytic practice." He suggested that Grünbaum's standard of verification was impossible not only for psychoanalysis but for "all forms of psychological knowledge". He credited Grünbaum with providing "informed criticism of the philosophical bases of psychoanalysis", but concluded that the "value of his argument falls short of providing a useful basis for advancing psychoanalytic knowledge and particularly for promoting the quest for pertinent standards of validation within psychoanalysis."

The philosopher James Hopkins argued that Grünbaum's criticism of Freud's theory of dreams is based on a misunderstanding of Freud, and that the modes of inquiry he endorses are inapplicable to motive and therefore inappropriate to assessing psychoanalysis. The philosopher Richard Wollheim criticized Grünbaum's style of writing, rejected his view that Freud employed the "Tally Argument", criticized his understanding of psychoanalytic practice, and accused him of ignoring the fact that clinical testing presupposes "a considerable body of extraclinical propositions." Robinson considered The Foundations of Psychoanalysis rigorous, but also poorly organized and difficult to understand for those without a background in philosophy, something that in his view had limited its influence. Though he believed that Grünbaum had great knowledge of Freud's writings, he argued that Freud may never have used the "Tally Argument". He also criticized Grünbaum's discussions of The Interpretations of Dreams and The Psychopathology of Everyday Life.

The philosopher Thomas Nagel argued that Grünbaum neglects "the distinctively inner character of psychological insight". The philosopher John Forrester described Grünbaum's understanding of science as ahistorical and unrealistic, and argued that Grünbaum misunderstood Freud's view of psychoanalysis. He accused Grünbaum of quoting Freud selectively to support his case, and of ignoring passages in Freud's writings that suggested a hermeneutic understanding of psychoanalysis. The psychologist Michael Billig noted that, in contrast to Grünbaum, psychologists such as Seymour Fisher, Roger P. Greenberg, and Paul Kline, "argue that the main elements of Freudian theory have been confirmed." The psychotherapist D. Patrick Zimmerman wrote that Grünbaum's conclusions about psychoanalysis have been applied by others to psychodynamic and other forms of verbal psychotherapy. He wrote that critical responses to Grünbaum have not had the same effect on the public as criticism of Freud. He argued that while Grünbaum's arguments were "bolstered by a reliance upon techniques and findings extrapolated from the field of physics ... his positions were sometimes flawed by basic misunderstandings about either the methods or the conclusions of physics", and that Grünbaum's criticisms of psychoanalysis applied only to "classical Freudian" views and not to more recent "psychodynamic conceptions". The philosopher Paul Fusella credited Grünbaum with exposing some of the weaknesses of Habermas's and Ricœur's interpretations of psychoanalysis. Though maintaining that psychoanalysis "remains relevant", he argued that the book left it unclear whether psychoanalysis would be considered pseudoscientific or an empirical science.

Grünbaum has also received criticism from some authors critical of psychoanalysis. Popper, responding to a description of Grünbaum's arguments provided to him by the journalist Daniel Goleman, denied that psychoanalysis can provide testable predictions. His comments were published in Behavioral and Brain Sciences. The journal's editor questioned whether it is worthwhile to attempt to test Freud's claims, comparing it to attempting to test astrology or creationism. The psychologist Malcolm Macmillan argued that Grünbaum's critique of free association is insufficiently convincing. Crews criticized Grünbaum for focusing on Freud's clinical theory while neglecting Freud's metapsychology, and for accepting Freud's claims to "methodological sophistication." The author Richard Webster argued that The Foundations of Psychoanalysis has been overvalued because of its abstract style of argument and has distracted attention away from issues such as Freud's character. The author Allen Esterson argued both that the "Tally Argument" is defective and also that it was not invoked by Freud. The philosopher Frank Cioffi criticized Grünbaum's treatment of Popper. The literature scholar Robert Wilcocks considered Grünbaum in some ways too favorable to Freud. He criticized Grünbaum for giving insufficient attention to Freud's use of cocaine and his treatment of Emma Eckstein. The philosopher Mikkel Borch-Jacobsen and the psychologist Sonu Shamdasani argued that Grünbaum's position that Freud was a "sophisticated scientific methodologist" who attempted to deal with the possible effects of suggestion on his patients through the "Tally Argument" is unjustified, since the argument presupposes, but does not prove, non-suggestibility. They rejected his view that Freud abandoned the seduction theory because of adverse evidence, maintaining that Freud could not have had any such evidence.

Popular press reviews
The Foundations of Psychoanalysis received positive reviews from Robert Hoffman in Library Journal and Crews in The New Republic, and a mixed review from the philosopher Jonathan Lieberson in The New York Review of Books.

Hoffman described the book as a careful and important work. Crews credited Grünbaum with showing that clinical evidence does not support Freud's ideas, convincingly criticizing the "Tally Argument" and the method of free association, and establishing that more recent versions of psychoanalysis suffer from the same problem as Freud's version, as well as discrediting Habermas and Ricœur's interpretations of psychoanalysis. He described it as an "epoch-making" work that was fair and rigorous, and wrote that it exposed psychoanalysis as a "speculative cult" and would inevitably lead to the discrediting of psychoanalytic therapy and its associated theory. However, he predicted that psychoanalysts would be slow to appreciate its importance and noted that Grünbaum's discussion of Habermas and Ricœur would be difficult for many readers to understand.

Lieberson described the book as "strangely organized" and "difficult" and compared it to "a string of scholarly articles to which vast accretions of evidence and afterthoughts have been added." He suggested that The Foundations of Psychoanalysis was so much a reaction to other interpreters of Freud that it was only incidentally a book about Freud himself, noting that a third of it was devoted to criticizing the hermeneutic approach to psychoanalysis. Though convinced by Grünbaum's criticism of the hermeneutic approach to psychoanalysis, he criticized his poor writing and rejected his view that it is important to establish a criterion to distinguish between scientific and unscientific statements. He considered his criticism of Popper less important than his attempt to identify the main obstacles to finding empirical support for psychoanalysis, crediting him with carefully exposing the flaws of Freud's argument that the therapeutic success of psychoanalysis confirms the interpretations made by analysts.

Academic reviews
The Foundations of Psychoanalysis received positive reviews from the psychiatrist Allan Hobson in The Sciences, the psychoanalyst Carlo Strenger in The International Journal of Psychoanalysis, Eagle in Philosophy of Science, the psychologist George Butterworth in Government and Opposition, the psychiatrist Nathaniel Laor in the American Journal of Psychiatry, Wallace in the Journal of Nervous and Mental Disease, and the philosopher Alessandro Pagnini in The Philosophical Quarterly. In Behavioral and Brain Sciences, The Foundations of Psychoanalysis received positive reviews from the bioethicist Arthur Caplan, Eagle, the philosopher Edward Erwin, the psychologist Hans Eysenck, the philosopher Owen Flanagan, Greenberg, Hobson, the psychologist Robert R. Holt, the psychologist Horst Kächele, the psychiatrist Gerald Klerman, the philosopher Valerii Leibin, the psychologist Lester Luborsky, the psychoanalyst Judd Marmor, the psychologist Joseph Masling, Pagnini, the psychoanalyst Morton F. Reiser, the philosopher Michael Ruse, the psychoanalyst Irwin Savodnik, the psychoanalyst Howard Shevrin, the psychiatrist Anthony Storr, the philosopher Frederick Suppe, the philosopher Barbara Von Eckardt, the sociologist Murray L. Wax, and the psychologist Robert L. Woolfolk.

The book received mixed reviews from the philosopher Howard Ruttenberg in Ethics, Kline in the British Journal for the Philosophy of Science, the philosopher M. A. Notturno and the psychiatrist Paul R. McHugh in Metaphilosophy, and the philosopher David Sachs in The Philosophical Review. In Behavioral and Brain Sciences, it received mixed reviews from Peter Caws, Cioffi, the psychoanalyst Marshall Edelson, the philosopher B. A. Farrell, Kline, Notturno and McHugh, George H. Pollock, the psychiatrist Donald P. Spence, the psychologist Hans Herrman Strupp, and the psychologist Paul L. Wachtel. The book received negative reviews from the sociologist Donald L. Carveth in Philosophy of the Social Sciences, Forrester, and the psychologist William R. Woodward, in Isis, and, in Behavioral and Brain Sciences, from the psychologist Matthew Hugh Erdelyi, the philosopher Arthur Fine, writing with Micky Forbes, and the psychologist Alan Gauld, writing with John Shotter.

Hobson, writing in The Sciences, described The Foundations of Psychoanalysis as the most important book about "Freud's status as a scientist" and compared it to the psychologist Frank Sulloway's Freud, Biologist of the Mind (1979). He credited Grünbaum with damaging psychoanalysis by showing the failure of psychoanalysts to refute the charge that free association is contaminated by suggestion, and using detailed textual analysis to criticize The Interpretation of Dreams, and with carefully re-evaluating Popper's position on psychoanalysis. However, he predicted that The Foundations of Psychoanalysis would "find difficult acceptance because his arguments will be unwelcome to Freud's loyalists", and that many uncommitted students of psychoanalysis would "find Grünbaum's dense prose and leaden language too high a price for the beauty of his inexorable logic." Nevertheless, he concluded that psychoanalysts should "welcome Grünbaum's award of tentative scientific status to psychoanalysis as a ray of hope for their embattled enterprise."

Strenger described the book as an impressive attempt to examine psychoanalytic theory in detail, and wrote that Grünbaum "displays a remarkable knowledge of psychoanalytic literature and his arguments are lucid and well documented, which allows for fruitful discussion and critique." Eagle, writing in Philosophy of Science, described The Foundations of Psychoanalysis as the most careful examination of the logical and philosophical foundations of Freudian theory to date. He considered Grünbaum's assessment of psychoanalysis superior to that of Popper. He praised Grünbaum's familiarity with Freud's writings and his criticism of Freud's theory of dreams, and credited him with demonstrating that there is no good evidence for the causal role of repression in the etiology of neurosis and with providing a convincing critique of hermeneutic interpretations of psychoanalysis. He believed that Grünbaum showed that clinical data by itself is insufficient to support the main propositions of psychoanalysis, but that he did not comprehensively discredit psychoanalysis.

Butterworth described Grünbaum's case that psychoanalysis can be tested as convincing. Laor described the book as "an admirably erudite and scholarly authoritative study". He credited Grünbaum with showing that Freud was aware of many of the problems with his theories. However, he criticized Grünbaum for failing to distinguish between psychoanalysts' reports and attempts at theorizing. Wallace described the book as important. He credited Grünbaum with convincingly criticizing hermeneutic interpretations of psychoanalysis. Pagnini, writing in The Philosophical Quarterly, credited Grünbaum with providing a careful analysis of the views of Habermas and Ricœur, convincingly criticizing Popper's accounts of both psychoanalysis and empirical testability, and "convincing evidence of the falsifiability of many Freudian theories". He also credited Grünbaum with showing that "the various formulations given by Freud of his theory of repression ... are based on spurious evidence and are weakened by serious logical defects". He wrote that Grünbaum could be criticized for ignoring some of the most important contemporary advocates of Freudian theories, but suggested that Grünbaum's "arguments against psychoanalysis can be extended with very few exceptions to the theories of these authors." He endorsed Grünbaum's view that Freud's main hypotheses could be validated only by extra-clinical studies, and believed that his work demonstrated the power and continued importance of analytic philosophy. However, he noted that The Foundations of Psychoanalysis was difficult to read.

Caplan considered the book important but difficult. He endorsed Grünbaum's criticisms of Habermas, Ricœur, and Popper. He praised Grünbaum's discussion of the "Tally Argument", arguing that it helped to show that the use of "extraclinical methods for verifying psychoanalysis" involves abandoning "the Freudian research strategy or program." He concluded that any hypotheses that could be verified through such methods would have "little relation" to the theory of Freud and his early followers. Eagle, writing in Behavioral and Brain Sciences, described The Foundations of Psychoanalysis as a "major contribution" to understanding both psychoanalysis and human behavior generally, and praised Grünbaum's critique of hermeneutic versions of psychoanalysis. Erwin credited Grünbaum with providing "a serious challenge to those who believe that they have rational grounds for accepting Freudian doctrines." He agreed with Grünbaum that changes in psychoanalytic theory made since Freud's work do not provide an answer to Grünbaum's critique. Eysenck praised Grünbaum's discussion of the "Tally Argument". He also complimented Grünbaum's critique of hermeneutic interpretations of psychoanalysis.

Flanagan credited Grünbaum with showing that there is no reliable evidence for the claims of psychoanalysis and that its scientific merit had not been established. He believed that if psychoanalysts acknowledged its importance, Grünbaum's critique would affect how psychoanalysis is viewed, including by psychoanalysts themselves. Greenberg credited Grünbaum with presenting a detailed examination of the arguments Freud used to justify his theories. He agreed with him that it is questionable to rely on case studies to assess Freud's ideas. Hobson, writing in Behavioral and Brain Sciences, described The Foundations of Psychoanalysis as an "epochal work" and credited Grünbaum with accurately describing his ideas about the neurophysiology of dreaming, providing a convincing critique of Freud's theory of dreams, and exposing the flaws of free association.

Holt credited Grünbaum with providing the most powerful and subtle philosophical evaluation of psychoanalysis and "the most substantial indictment of Freud as a scientist that we have yet seen." However, he believed that Grünbaum exaggerated "the dearth of supportive evidence for Freud's theories" as well as the problems facing contemporary psychoanalysis and the extent to which free association was undermined by suggestion. Kächele agreed with Grünbaum that clinical evidence could not be used to make definitive claims about the causes of neuroses. However, he believed that Grünbaum's criticism of "clinical wisdom" ignored the effectiveness of psychoanalytic theory. Klerman considered the book important. He credited Grünbaum with refuting hermeneutic interpretations of psychoanalysis, as well as with refuting Popper's views, and showing that psychoanalysts could not rely on clinical evidence to support psychoanalytic propositions. He concluded that the work showed that the scientific status of psychoanalysis had not been established. Leibin credited Grünbaum with providing a useful discussion of a range of views on psychoanalysis. He agreed with him that the views of Habermas, Ricœur, and Popper are flawed. However, he argued that Freud provided multiple definitions of psychoanalysis, some of which could be understood as viewing it as a form of hermeneutics. Luborsky praised Grünbaum's openness to "cogent evidence" and agreed with him that inferences by therapists about their patients' past were questionable.

Marmor credited Grünbaum with extensive knowledge of psychoanalytic literature in general and Freud's work in particular, with showing that free association, as well as other aspects of psychoanalytic theory, were scientifically unsupported, and with summarizing much evidence against the view that the success of psychoanalysis or other forms of therapy establishes the correctness of their underlying theories. However, he criticized his style of writing. He also believed that the idea that conflict played a role in the causation of psychopathology retained some validity and noted that Grünbaum failed to discuss this issue, or to explore "the issue of causality as a multifactorial rather than a unifactorial phenomenon". Masling agreed with Grünbaum that cases histories cannot serve as the sole support for psychoanalytic theory. However, he criticized Grünbaum for failing to fully discuss relevant experimental evidence. Pagnini, writing in Behavioral and Brain Sciences, agreed with Grünbaum that Freud understood psychoanalysis as a natural science and that hermeneutic interpretations of psychoanalysis are incorrect. Reiser praised Grünbaum's discussion of the "Tally Argument" and agreed with him that validation of psychoanalytic claims had to be based ultimately on extraclinical findings. Ruse called the work insightful. He endorsed Grünbaum's criticisms of Popper, and argued that he helped to show that the testing of psychoanalytic hypotheses about homosexuality was suspect. Savodnik described the book as the most important critique of psychoanalysis.

Shevrin complimented Grünbaum for his "critique of the psychoanalytic clinical method", but believed the work was likely to be misunderstood as an attack on psychoanalysis rather than an attempt at suggesting how it could be given a better empirical basis. He also believed that Grünbaum went too far in his rejection of clinical method. Storr credited Grünbaum with convincingly criticizing free association, Freud's theory of dreams, and Popper, and with showing that attempts to validate psychoanalytic claims must be based on extraclinical testing. However, he believed that The Foundations of Psychoanalysis was poorly written. Suppe praised Grünbaum's discussion of the "Tally Argument", and argued that Grünbaum's critique of psychoanalysis had implications for psychoanalytic approaches to homosexuality. Von Eckardt praised Grünbaum's discussion of the "Tally Argument", but considered The Foundations of Psychoanalysis poorly written. Wax considered Grünbaum's approach objective, but believed he presented only one possible interpretation of Freud. Woolfolk credited Grünbaum with convincingly criticizing hermeneutic interpretations of psychoanalysis, but argued that he left some issues unexplored.

Ruttenberg considered the book carefully argued, and wrote that Grünbaum made a brilliant case that psychoanalytic hypotheses should be tested by normal scientific procedures. However, he believed Grünbaum overstated the case against psychoanalysis. Kline, writing in the British Journal for the Philosophy of Science, credited Grünbaum with making a powerful case against the idea that repression is pathogenic for neurosis and with demonstrating that clinical data cannot support psychoanalytic theory. He also considered Grünbaum's case against hermeneutic interpretations of psychoanalysis convincing, and believed he exposed shortcomings of Popper's views. However, he maintained that Grünbaum, without justification, rejected experimental evidence held to support Freudian theory. He suggested that Grünbaum, as a philosopher, lacked the competence to evaluate such evidence. Notturno and McHugh, writing in Metaphilosophy, agreed with Grünbaum that the clinical evidence held to provide the empirical basis for psychoanalysis is weak and that the validation of Freud's main hypotheses must come mainly from extra-clinical studies, but found these points consistent with the critiques of psychoanalysis made by Popper, Habermas, and Ricœur and as such unsurprising. They argued that, notwithstanding Grünbaum's critique of Popper, parts of his analysis of psychoanalysis support Popper's critique of psychoanalysis; they also argued that Grünbaum misunderstood Popper's epistemology and faulted him for neglecting Popper's The Logic of Scientific Discovery (1959) and Realism and the Aims of Science (1983). Though believing that it raised important issues, they questioned his argument that the psychoanalytic theory of paranoia is falsifiable. They also questioned his view that Popper was largely ignorant of Freud's writings and disputed his position that Freud was open to the possibility of his theories being falsified.

Sachs described the book as a "provocative" work that had received respectful attention because of Grünbaum's knowledge of Freud's work and developments in psychoanalysis after Freud. Though he considered it an important criticism of psychoanalysis, he suggested that too much of it was devoted to criticizing Habermas and Ricœur, that Grünbaum misunderstood some of Freud's claims, falsely attributed the "Tally Argument" to Freud, overstated the extent to which Freud's theories depended on clinical data, provided a vague discussion of suggestion and ignored some of Freud's responses to the charge that his clinical data were unreliable, and unconvincingly criticized free association. He faulted his treatment of The Interpretation of Dreams and The Psychopathology of Everyday Life, arguing that he ignored interrelations between them and some of Freud's other works.

Caws believed Grünbaum exposed the inadequacies of psychoanalysis. He praised his discussion of the "Tally Argument", and endorsed Grünbaum's criticisms of Habermas. Cioffi described the book as "ambitious and illuminating", but criticized Grunbaum's view that Freud relied on the "Tally Argument". He accused Grunbaum of making selective use of Freud's writings to defend his position. Edelson considered the book sophisticated. He believed that Grünbaum's discussion of the "Tally Argument" helped to show that psychoanalysts are mistaken to rely on clinical data to make causal claims. Nevertheless, he believed that Grünbaum went too far by rejecting any use of clinical evidence by psychoanalysts to support its causal claims. While he agreed with Grünbaum's call for studies to test psychoanalytic hypotheses, he argued that Grünbaum ignored inherent problems with studies of the kind he advocated. He also faulted Grünbaum's discussions of free association and the possibility of testing the psychoanalytic theory of paranoia.

Farrell agreed with Grünbaum's argument against Freud's method of clinical observation, but nevertheless found it "vague and obscure" and believed that it had "serious limitations" that would lead to its rejection by psychoanalysts. Kline, writing in  Behavioral and Brain Sciences, credited Grünbaum with convincingly criticizing both Freud's clinical method and hermeneutic interpretations of psychoanalysis. However, he rejected Grünbaum's view that if the theory of repression can be invalidated, this would discredit psychoanalytic theory in general. Kline also accused Grünbaum of misunderstanding his arguments for the existence of repression, ignoring relevant evidence, and citing weak evidence. Notturno and McHugh, writing in Behavioral and Brain Sciences, endorsed Grünbaum's view that the clinical evidence used as a basis for psychoanalysis is weak and that validation of Freud's claims must be based on extraclinical studies. However, they rejected his view that psychoanalysis is falsifiable, criticized his discussion of the psychoanalytic theory of paranoia, and disputed his position that Freud was open to the possibility of his theories being falsified. Pollock believed that it was constructive for Grünbaum to criticize psychoanalysis, but that there were convincing responses to his arguments. He also argued that Grünbaum failed to sufficiently distinguish between Freud's work and psychoanalysis generally.

Spence argued that Grünbaum's charge that free association is undermined by suggestion might be correct, but that the evidence necessary to draw that conclusion was unavailable. Strupp saw Grünbaum's discussion of Freud as having merit, but criticized his discussion of psychotherapy. Wachtel considered the book to be of lasting value, but criticized Grünbaum's discussions of the development of Freud's work, the psychoanalytic theory of paranoia, and the "Tally Argument". Carveth described the book as more balanced than several other critiques of Freud. However, although he considered Grünbaum correct in some of his criticisms of Habermas and Ricœur, he maintained that Grünbaum failed to deal adequately with the argument that Freud may have been mistaken to view psychoanalysis as a natural science. He argued that Grünbaum's challenge to the hermeneutic approach to psychoanalysis more broadly was flawed. He also criticized his discussion of the issues involved in testing the psychoanalytic theory of paranoia.

Forrester described the book as poorly written and organized. He argued that the view that Freud considered psychoanalysis only a natural science is an oversimplification and that Grünbaum misinterpreted Habermas and misrepresented Ricœur. He criticized Grünbaum's discussion of the "Tally Argument", arguing that Grünbaum incorrectly maintained that Freud viewed therapeutic success as the only source of evidence for the accuracy of his theories. He also criticized his discussions of repression and free association. Woodward considered Grünbaum correct to point to "the need for empirical testing of psychoanalytic concepts". However, he accused him of presenting a "caricature" of psychoanalysis and ignored important aspects of psychoanalytic theory. He criticized Grünbaum's discussion of the "Tally Argument". Erdelyi questioned whether Freud actually employed the "Tally Argument" and maintained that neither the failure of the argument nor the existence of spontaneous remission of symptoms damaged psychoanalysis. He argued that Grünbaum failed to take fully into account developments in psychoanalysis, over-emphasized its clinical aspects, and had a questionable understanding of psychoanalytic theory. Fine and Forbes maintained that Grünbaum mistakenly claimed that Freud's causal hypotheses are unsupported by clinical data and incorrectly judged "individual causal hypotheses separately". They also faulted his discussions of suggestion and free association. Gauld and Shotter accused Grünbaum of misrepresenting them.

See also
 Decline and Fall of the Freudian Empire
 Freud and His Critics
 Freud and the Question of Pseudoscience
 Freud Evaluated
 Philosophical Essays on Freud
 Unauthorized Freud
 Validation in the Clinical Theory of Psychoanalysis
 Why Freud Was Wrong

References

Bibliography
Books

 
 
 
 
 
 
 
 
 
 
 
 
 
 
 
 
 
 
 
 
 

Journals

 
 
 
 
 
 
 
 
 
 
 
 
 
 
 
 
 
 
  
 
 
  
 
  
  
 
 
 
 
 
 
 
 
 
 
 
  
 
 
 
 
  
 
 
 
  
 
 
 
 
 
 
 
 
 
 
 
 
 
  
 
 
  
 
  
 

1984 non-fiction books
American non-fiction books
Analytic philosophy literature
Books about psychoanalysis
Books by Adolf Grünbaum
English-language books
Philosophy books
University of California Press books
Works about philosophy of psychology